

Description
This small cactus grows up to 12 cm high and up to 8 cm wide. When young this species has wooly areoles though when mature it has 13–15 radiant spine and 4 central spines one being hooked. The flowers are 2 cm across and usually occur in a ring along the top of the plant, var. albiflora is a variation not known to occur in the wild.

References

zeilmanniana
Cacti of Mexico
Endemic flora of Mexico
Flora of the Chihuahuan Desert
Garden plants of North America
Endangered plants
Taxonomy articles created by Polbot